Edward J. Cannon (born Juneau County, Wisconsin, February 21, 1866 – 1934) was the first and longest-serving dean of the Gonzaga University School of Law. He served as dean from 1912 to 1934.

Career
A well respected lawyer, Cannon was lauded as "one of the brilliant members of the Spokane bar. At the time of his death in 1934, Cannon was also honored as a "model trial lawyer" by his peers.

Personal
While at Gonzaga, he and his wife Helen lived in a house built in 1911, at 416 E. Rockwood Boulevard in Spokane. Now known as the Edward & Helen Cannon House, it was placed on the National Register on April 14, 1997, and the Spokane Register on February 7, 2005.

References

Gonzaga University faculty
People from Juneau County, Wisconsin
Washington (state) lawyers
1866 births
1934 deaths
People from Spokane, Washington